{{Speciesbox
|genus = Erigeron
|species = cervinus
|authority = Greene
|synonyms_ref = 
|synonyms = 'Erigeron delicatus Cronquist
}}Erigeron cervinus is a North American species of flowering plant in the family Asteraceae known by the common names Siskiyou fleabane and Siskiyou daisy.Erigeron cervinus'' is native to the Klamath Mountains of northwestern California and southwestern Oregon. This uncommon wildflower is a perennial herb reaching heights of 15 to 30 centimeters (8-12 inches). Its leaves may be up to 12 centimeters (5 inches) long and are vaguely spoon-shaped. The erect stems hold inflorescences of 1 to 4 flower heads. Each head is about a centimeter (0.4 inches) wide and has a center of golden yellow disc florets surrounded by a fringe of ray florets which are usually white.

References

External links
Jepson Manual Treatment
United States Department of Agriculture Plants Profile
Calphotos Photo gallery, University of California
Photo of herbarium specimen at Missouri Botanical Garden, collected in Del North County in 1922, isotype of Erigeron delicatus

cervinus
Flora of California
Flora of Oregon
Plants described in 1897
Flora without expected TNC conservation status